Alvaro Guillot (1931–2010) was a French artist born in Uruguay. He was a notable exponent of the "new surrealist school".

Guillot's post-surrealist late 20th and early 21st century acrylics and oils celebrated New Mexico landscapes, cats, horses, bovines, stunted juniper uplands, prominent green, red and yellow chili peppers, with color schemes and adroit shadows that defied all previous Western landscape artistic visions; borrowing from none, embracing something altogether new and intoxicating. There are vestiges of his early years in South America, but also the best of mid-century Paris, and contemporary Cuban art.

Guillot remained a quiet presence for over two decades in Santa Fe, New Mexico, shunning exhibitions and most galleries, preferring the sheer joys of privacy amongst a select coterie of like-minded friends, most notably, Jean Morrison.

Known by his closest colleagues as one of the great raconteurs, satirists and political pundits (as far Left as the direction will ever have meaning) he was also an exquisitely talented - but again, private - writer whose memoirs about such close friends of his as the great Salvador Dalí and architect, Le Corbusier, as well as Picasso, will soon be published.

Some of Guillot's exploits were fictionalized in the Michael Tobias novel, The Adventures of Mr Marigold (2005).

References

External links 

 
Alvaro Guillot Show Slated For Today At Galerie Juarez (Palm Beach Daily News, March 1965)
Alvaro Guillot, Uruguayan (1931 - 2010) (rogallery.com)

20th-century French painters
20th-century French male artists
French male painters
21st-century French painters
21st-century French male artists
1931 births
2010 deaths